The Squash competition at the World Games 2009 took place from July 21 to July 24 at the Chung Cheng Martial Arts Stadium in Kaohsiung, Taiwan.

Participating nations

 Australia (8)
 Austria (1)
 British Virgin Island (1)
 Canada (2)
 Chinese Taipei (2)
 Egypt (4)
 France (4)
 Germany (3)
 Great Britain (4)
 Guatemala (1)
 Hong Kong (4)
 Hungary (2)
 India (3)
 Ireland (1)
 Japan (2)
 Malaysia (7)
 Mexico (1)
 Netherlands (2)
 New Zealand (2)
 Russia (1)
 South Africa (2)
 South Korea (2)
 United States (1)

Medals table

Medals summary

References

 
2009 World Games
Squash records and statistics